Sanja Knežević (born 23 January 1984) is Montenegrin basketball player. She plays at position Power forward.

References

External links
Profile at eurobasket.com

Living people
1984 births
People from Bijelo Polje
Montenegrin women's basketball players
Power forwards (basketball)